Manavasi is a village in Southern Indian state of Tamil Nadu between the cities of Karur and Trichy. It is located in the Karur district. It is the location of the Toll Plaza on the Karur - Trichy Highway. One of the oldest Lord Shiva temple is located in Manavasi where Lord Shiva facing west direction. Kaasi, Avinashi and Manavasi is the places where Lord shiva statue facing west direction.

Temple called

On the way to pidari amman Kovil, Every year Tamil Month aadi 28th, Pankaligal (father side relations) from different part of Tamil Nadu assemble & perform Pooja at night. its happening more than 800 Years. Community called Pillai performing kula deivam pooja for every year 28th date of Aadi month

Notable people 

 Manavasi Ramaswami Iyer, a devotee of Ramana Maharshi, is from this village.

References 

Villages in Karur district